Aeruginospora furfuracea is a species of fungus in the family Hygrophoraceae. The species, described by Egon Horak in 1973, is found in New Zealand. It is currently placed in the genus Aeruginospora, but may actually belong in Camarophyllopsis.

References

External links

Tricholomataceae
Fungi of New Zealand
Fungi described in 1973
Taxa named by Egon Horak